A metal carbido complex is a coordination complex that contains a carbon atom as a ligand. Carbido complexes are a molecular subclass of carbides, which are prevalent. Carbido complexes represent models for intermediates in Fischer–Tropsch synthesis and related catalytic processes. They are also used as precursors for the synthesis of more complicated carbides. They are analogous to metal nitrido complexes.

Carbido clusters

Most molecular carbido complexes are clusters, usually featuring carbide as a six-fold bridging ligand.

Clusters without CO ligands are also known.

Doubly bridging carbide ligands
Bridging carbido ligands can be subdivided into three classes:
cumulenic ,
metallocarbyne , and
polar covalent .
Cumulenic compounds generally bridge two metal atoms of the same element and are symmetrical. However, there are exceptions to this.

Terminal carbido ligands
In rare cases, carbido ligands are terminal. The complex can be obtained by metathesis of vinyl acetate to give  results in a metastable  complex, which eliminates acetic acid.

The "naked" carbido ligand is weakly basic, forming complexes with other metal centers. The C-M bond is typically found to be around 1.65 angstroms. The 13CNMR resonance values for the carbido carbons vary widely, but range from δ211-406.

See also
Metallocarbohedryne ("met-car"), a stable cluster with formula  (M = Ti, Zr, V, etc.)

References

Organometallic compounds
Organometallic chemistry